Mount Guiting-Guiting is the highest mountain in the province of Romblon, located in Sibuyan Island, in the Philippines, with an elevation of  above sea level. Its steep slopes and jagged peak, have earned it a reputation as one of the most difficult and technically most challenging mountains to climb in the Philippines. It is ranked as the 11th-most prominent mountain in the Philippines, and 71st-highest peak of an island in the world. Located at the heart of Sibuyan, it dominates the landscape   for miles around. Guiting-Guiting, in the Romblomanon dialect means  "jagged". It is one of the focal points of Sibuyan's declaration as a biodiversity haven and has been dubbed by some local and international natural scientists as The Galapagos of Asia. The  island of Sibuyan has been compared numerous times with the biodiversity endemism rate of the Galapagos islands in Ecuador. This high endemism prompted much of the mountain and its slopes to be protected in 1996 as the Mt. Guiting-Guiting Natural Park. The park also encompasses nearby Mt. Nailog (789 masl) to the west.

Hiking
It is often referred to as Mount G2, although the nickname is not accepted by the locals as it disrespects the indigenous name of the sacred site. The mountain is open all year round for hiking, with two established trails; the Tampayan Trail from the north, and the Olango Trail from the south. Hiking permits and guides are secured from the DENR office in Magdiwang town. The entire upper trails consist of exposed, broken, and sharp ultramafic rocks and boulders. The summit area of Mt. Guiting-Guiting is primarily a heath land and grassland with exposed rocks on the serrated ridges of the peak.

Though the length and duration of the climb is relatively shorter, two days to climb up and one day to descend, this mountain is still acknowledged as one of the most difficult and technically challenging Philippine mountain to climb, with 9/9 difficulty, alongside Mount Halcon in Mindoro, Mount Mantalingajan in Palawan and  Mount Baloy, Mount Nangtud and Mount Madja-as in Antique.

History 
In May 1982, under the leadership of Arturo Valdez, a joint team from the Bacolod-based Philippine Mountaineering Society (PMS) and the University of the Philippines (UP) assaulted the mountain, the attempt of which was to be the first in history.

It was during this expedition that one of the peaks, now known as Mayo's Peak was named after one of the team members, Mayo Monteza, who celebrated his birthday during the climb. One of the water spring sources is now known as Bulod's Spring, after a local guides named Bulod who volunteered (along with another locals) to join the climb.

The team failed to take the summit on this first attempt, but came back two weeks afterwards. On 17 June 1982, four climbers became the first to stand at the summit. Their names are Mon Ruiz, Kim Valino, Roel Tan Torres (of UP mountaineers) and Edwin Gatia of the PMS team.

Biodiversity 

Sibuyan Island has extremely high endemism largely due to its remoteness. More than half of the Island is covered with forest. Preliminary reports include that the forest density in Sibuyan is 1,551 trees per hectare making it the densest forest ever recorded in the Philippines. There exists a full range of forest gradient in the Philippines consisting of mangrove, lowland, montane, mossy forests, heathland, and grassland—from the shoreline up to the summit of Mt. Guiting-Guiting,

There are approximately 700 vascular plant species, including 54 species that are endemic to the island.  These include Nepenthes sibuyanensis; Nepenthes argentii; Heterospathe sibuyanensis Becc. (Bil-is), Agamyla sibuyanensis (Sibuyan lipstick plant); Myrmephytum beccarii Elmer (Sibuyan ant plant); Begonia gitingensis Elmer (Guiting-guiting begonia).

A total of 130 species of birds have been recorded in the park, of which 102 are either known or presumed to be breeding residents. There are also nine (9) native non-flying terrestrial mammal species, nine fruit bats species, of which one is endemic, and nine (9) lizards and geckos.

Gallery

See also
 List of Ultras of the Philippines
 List of islands by highest point

References

External links

 Mount Guiting-Guiting Traverse by BluishTrekker (November 2-3, 2012)
 Map showing islands of Romblon province with Mount Guiting-guiting Natural Park highlighted on SIbuyan island

Guiting-Guiting
Natural parks of the Philippines
Landforms of Romblon